Baringa may refer to:
 Baringa, Democratic Republic of the Congo, a village in Tshuapa Province, Befale Territory 
 Baringa, Queensland, a suburb in the Sunshine Coast Region, Queensland, Australia
 Baringa (prehistoric animal), within the subfamily Macropodinae